The Donegal Railway Company (DR) was a  gauge railway in Ireland.

History

The company was formed in 1892 by a merger of the Finn Valley Railway and the West Donegal Railway.

 
Further new lines were built with a Government grant of £300,000,:
 Stranorlar and Glenties , opened 1895 (stations: Stranorlar, Ballybofey, Glenmore, Cloghan, Ballinamore, Fintown, Shallogans and Glenties)
 Donegal Town to Killybegs , opened 1893 (stations: Donegal Town, Killymard, Mountcharles, Doorin Road, Inver, Port, Dunkineely, Bruckless, Ardara Road and Killybegs)

Other extensions followed later:
 Strabane to Derry , opened 1901 (station: Strabane, Ballymagorry, Ballyheather, Donemana, Cullion, New Buildings and Derry Victoria Road)
 Donegal Town to Ballyshannon , was the last section to be completed and opened 2 September 1905  (Station: Donegal Town, Hospital Halt, Drumbar, Laghey, Bridgetown, Ballintra, Dromore Halt, Dorrian's Bridge Halt, Rossnowlagh, Friary Halt, Coolmore, Creevy, Legalton Halt and Ballyshannon)

In 1906 it was obtained by the joint interest of the Great Northern Railway of Ireland and the Midland Railway Northern Counties Committee which set up a new company, the County Donegal Railways Joint Committee.

Footnotes

Railway companies established in 1892
1892 establishments in Ireland
Railway companies disestablished in 1906
Great Northern Railway (Ireland)
Defunct railway companies of Ireland
Transport in County Donegal
Transport in County Tyrone